Fun'ya no Asayasu, also Bunya no Asayasu, (文屋朝康, end of the 9th century — beginning of 10th century) was a Japanese poet of Heian period.

He was the son of Fun'ya no Yasuhide

His poem in the Hyakunin Isshu is No. 37:

He is said to have composed this verse at the request of the Emperor Daigo in the year 900.

External links
 A Hundred Verses from Old Japan (The Hyakunin-isshu), tr. by William N. Porter, 1909, at sacred-texts.com

10th-century Japanese poets
Hyakunin Isshu poets